Hohenbergia pabstii is a plant species in the genus Hohenbergia. This species is endemic to Brazil.

References

pabstii
Flora of Brazil